Brouwerij Timmermans (Timmermans Brewery) is a lambic brewery in Itterbeek, Belgium, founded in 1702.

References

External links
Official site (English)

Belgian brands
Breweries of Flanders
Companies based in Flemish Brabant
Dilbeek